Sittin' in a Tree is an EP by Juliana Hatfield and Frank Smith that was released in 2007.

Track listing

Personnel
Juliana Hatfield – vocals and guitar
Aaron Sinclair – guitar, vocals, drums on "Kitten"
Scott Toomey – guitar, keyboards, and vocals
Brett Saiia – banjo and vocals
Steve Malone – pedal steel guitar
Dan Burke – bass
Drew Roach – drums

Production
Producer: Aaron Sinclair and Scott Toomey
Engineer: Scott Toomey
Mixing: Scott Toomey and Aaron Sinclair
Mastering: Nick Zampiello
Design: Jordyn Bonds

References

Juliana Hatfield albums
2007 EPs